Jersey club (originally called Brick City club) is a style of electronic club music that originated in Newark, New Jersey in the early 2000s. It was pioneered by DJ Tameil and other members of the Brick Bandits crew, who were inspired by Baltimore club's uptempo hybrid of house and hip hop. Other young producers also pushed for the progression of this style of music in the late 2000s.

Similarly to its Baltimore influences, Jersey club is an aggressive style defined by its fast, “bouncy” groove at tempos near 130–140 BPM, but more prominent use of staccato, chopped samples and heavy triplet kick patterns. The style often consists of remixes of rap and R&B tracks. It is often accompanied by frenetic, competitive dances which have gained global popularity through viral videos.

Style and characteristics
Jersey club has been described as a "fast and aggressive dance music" with roots in the Baltimore club scene's fusion of house music and hip hop. By comparison with the Baltimore style, Jersey producers prioritize harder kick sounds and more extensively chopped samples. The distinctive "bounciness" of the style is a result of its triplet percussive pattern, often derived from the beat of Tapp's "Dikkontrol." 808 bass sounds and sampled breakbeats from Lyn Collins' "Think (About It)" are commonly employed, as well as varied pop culture references. Common audio programs used are Sony Acid Pro and FL Studio.

Producers make use of "big kick drum triplets and vocal clips that call out dances, or chopped samples from top rap and R&B tracks," and construct the tracks on "anything from jog shuttle MP3 controllers to turntables and Serato." Brick Bandits member Dirty South Joe noted that "vocals are chopped, fragmented and layered over heavy bass kicks to deconstruct the source material, and rework it for the dance floor." He called it "aggressive, yet melodic and sexy." Billboard described it as "repetitive and loud [..] It lands somewhere between New York's vogue and Chicago's juke with a little bit of that nasty from Miami bass." DJ Sliink summarized it as "a more urban take to dance music with chopped vocals and breaks."

History

Origins: 1999–2002
Chicago house was popular in Newark's 1990s club scene, where it was referred to generically by some as "club music." Other styles such as urban club and juke were also played. By 1999, Baltimore house records such as Tapp's "Shake Dat Ass" and "Dikkontrol" were influential, and DJs such as Nix In The Mix, Mustafah, Torry T and Mista Quietman helped to introduce this sound to New Jersey. DJ Tameil, who became known for his Chicago house mixtapes as a teenager, later established connections with the Baltimore scene through Bernie Rabinowitz of the Music Liberated record store; he was subsequently introduced to Baltimore stars such as DJ Technics and Rod Lee. Tameil did not put artist names on his mixes, making it difficult for other Jersey producers to identify his sources. He began playing Baltimore records at teen parties and clubs in the downtown Newark area.

Tameil was among the first Jersey artists to produce his own club tracks in 2001 with the Dat Butt EP, released on his own label Anthrax Records. A week later the Newark group The OG's also self-released an EP titled Official Ghetto Style. Tameil began to burn his own CDs and sold them on Broad Street in Newark. Around this time, DJs Tim Dolla and Mike V also began producing their own club tracks as the Brick Bandits to challenge Tameil's monopoly on the market. The two parties initially feuded but Tameil later joined the group, coining the phrase "Brick City club" in 2002 in reference to Newark's nickname "Brick City." They released popular mixtapes which featured both club and house tracks. Around this time, Bernie Rabinowitz died and the steady stream of Baltimore releases into New Jersey largely ceased, leaving Jersey artists to develop their own scene. Club parties, hosted primarily in ballrooms and banquet halls, began emerging in Newark and surrounding suburbs such as East Orange and Irvington. Despite violence in the city, parties thrown by the Brick Bandits or at the Branch Brook Skating Rink were known to be safe spaces for kids.

Regional development: 2003–2009
Many young Newark producers soon began leaving for college or employment, causing there to be a temporary drought of producers around 2003 but spreading the style to other locations. Meanwhile, Tameil, Dolla, and Mike V were utilizing Sony Acid Pro, a digital audio workstation that remains popular with Jersey club producers, to create music and support themselves. Around 2005, a younger generation began to emerge alongside these older producers, with groups like the Partyhoppers of Elizabeth, New Jersey, initially dissing and then joining the Brick Bandits. Around this time, the name of the genre changed to "Jersey club" to account for its spread beyond Newark, as increasingly popularity on college campuses and the success of Baltimore club raised the scene's profile on the Internet, particularly through Myspace.

Around this time, the Jersey style drifted away from the Baltimore template and its palette became more distinctive as younger producer-DJs such as Nadus, Sliink, Jayhood, and R3LL began receiving recognition. R3LL, then a high school student, became known as a promoter of parties and later spread the music to college campuses in North Jersey. Around 2007, Philadelphia began developing its own club scene influenced by the Jersey style. Around 2008, the genre began receiving airplay on major rap and R&B stations like Hot 97 and Power 105. By 2009, it had spread to 21+ clubs and new, older demographics. Around this time, the scene shifted toward competitive dancing and battling became a central element inspired by DJ Fresh's "Get Silly," along with MCing by figures such as Lil Man. Tim Dolla produced a hit track called "Swing Dat" in reference to the popular dance move, and subsequent dance tracks like DJ Fresh's "Get Silly" and Jayhood's "Patty Cake" and DJ Tone Dafire Marshal's "She Gotta Donkey" & "Get Downtown" went viral via YouTube.

International attention: 2010–present
By 2010, electronic music artists from other scenes were drawing influence from the Jersey club sound, including Norwegian producers Cashmere Cat and Lido; LA club producers; "festival trap" and EDM producers with the support of Mad Decent and Skrillex; and dance artists such as Brenmar and the Night Slugs label roster. Concerns about appropriation of the style have become prevalent, with privileged outsiders coopting the sound to get bookings. R&B singer Ciara, in her comeback single "Level Up," uses a beat structure that is similar to that which is used in Jersey club music. For DJ Khaled's single "To the Max", DJ Jayhood even claims that DJ Khaled was inspired by his Jersey club single "HeartBroken". Jersey club also played an essential role during the early and mid-2010s in the development of experimental dance genres, such as deconstructed club. Jersey club became an integral fixture of the alternative NYC party scene and was played at underground parties such as GHE20G0TH1K which served to be essential to the developing sound of deconstructed club music.

The style and its direct derivatives have become known on the internet due to music sharing websites and social media such as SoundCloud, YouTube, Vine and Dubsmash across the United States, Australia, New Zealand, and Europe. Meanwhile, native Jersey DJs such as Uniiqu3 and DJ Sliink have taken the sound to international audiences, and rave-like parties such as DJ Nadus's #THREAD and Uniiqu3's #135 have incorporated more eclectic formats of club music. When Uniiqu3 began DJing in 2009 at age 18, she was likely the only female DJ in the scene; today, other female producers such as Kayy Drizz and So Dellirious are also present. In December 2014, Newark hosted the Jersey Club awards to honor artists from the scene. In 2019, Uniiqu3 began the PBNJ party series bringing together club artists from Philadelphia, Baltimore, and New Jersey.

In 2019, Jersey club artist Unicorn aka Killa Kherk Cobain's song "It's Time" shifted the Jersey club sound into the hip-hop mainstream after being debuted at the 2019 Summer Jam Concert by Hot 97's DJ Enuff.  Unicorn aka Killa Kherk Cobain ks credited as the first to person to rap on a Jersey club record after rapping on his 2007 collaboration with the late DJ K-Swift, "Tote It Remix". Spin Magazine described Killa Kherk Cobain's fusion of trap rap, house music, and Jersey club as "the less innocent side of the Jersey club scene". Killa Kherk and his producer DJ Fade (a collective known as "Jersey Gods") have since lent their unique fusion of Jersey Club/Hip Hop production to mainstream recording artists, including Pop Smoke, Fivio Foreign, Chris Brown, and Swizz Beats.

Jersey club artist Cookiee Kawaii's song "Vibe" was a 2020 viral sensation, sparking worldwide fanfare on the social media app TikTok.

Track star and Olympic gold medalist Sydney McLaughlin, of Dunellen, New Jersey, has said she listens to Jersey club music.

In September 2021, Jersey club producer and DJ Uniiqu3 had her breakthrough single "Microdosing" used to Soundtrack Versace x Fendi "Fendaci" catwalk collection. 

In 2022 Drake released his seventh studio album Honestly, Nevermind which contains the song "Currents", that was heavily influenced by Jersey club music and features the characteristic Some Cut bed squeak sample. The track "Sticky" uses the Baltimore Club five beat bass drum pattern.

In 2022, Lil Uzi Vert dropped their viral Jersey Club song "Just Wanna Rock" which went viral all over social media sites, including TikTok and Twitter and has since charted at number 10 on the Billboard Hot 100.

Jersey club rap 

2018-2020 were pivotal to the resurgence in popularity of Jersey club music as, for the first time ever, Jersey artists (rappers and singers) began making original rap songs using Jersey club beats.  East Orange rapper Unicorn151 aka Killa Kherk Cobain, Irvington songstress Cookiee Kawaii, and Newark producer/DJ/artist Uniiqu3 began to format Jersey club beats into song format using their own vocals and lyrics for verses, hooks, and bridges.  Morphing Jersey Club into this sample-free, lyric infused song format now allowed radio stations like Hot 97, Z100, Power 105.1, and Sirius XM to play these records in regular rotation with Hip-Hop, R&B, Top 40, etc.  This allowed Jersey Club music to gain a much wider audience.  Where Jersey Club music was originally pioneered, produced, and created by the producers and the DJ's, the years 2018 - 2020 saw the emergence of the first ever Jersey Club "Artists". Unicorn151 aka Killa Kherk Cobain, Cookiee Kawaii, Uniiqu3, Chad B and DJ Jay Hood fall into this new category of Jersey Club Artists.

Unicorn151 aka Killa Kherk Cobain alongside producers Ace Mula and DJ Fade began experimenting with a new sound for Jersey Club music in 2018. While 99% of the Jersey Club music being created catered to dancers and children, Unicorn151, Ace Mula, and DJ Fade began producing songs that catered to their gangsta rap fans.  Simultaneously in neighboring Brooklyn, New York, the Brooklyn drill sound of Pop Smoke, Fivio Foreign, and 22Gz was also becoming a worldwide phenomena, which naturally trickled its influence and sound to the neighboring boroughs of NYC and nearby New Jersey.  DJ Fade and Unicorn, through mutual friends at the radio stations, were able to collaborate with these Brooklyn drill rappers to produce Jersey Club remixes for many popular Brooklyn drill artists.  While the DJ Fade and Unicorn duo, known as Jersey Gods, were the first to fuse both sounds, these songs were not yet considered Jersey Drill, but rather Jersey Club mixes of Brooklyn drill and UK drill.

In 2019 Ace Mula was commissioned to produce Jersey Club beats for Unicorn151 aka Killa Kherk Cobain to rap over. Ace Mula's beats were specifically tailored for trap, drill, and Gangsta rap, which allowed Unicorn151 to maintain his natural rap cadence, while the beats switched between trap, drill, and Jersey club beats throughout the songs. This specific usage of Brooklyn drill inspired production on top of Jersey club beat patterns gave each record a distinct sound that could easily be identified as having origins in New Jersey. These newfound Jersey club rap records inspired many rappers in Newark and the surrounding areas to embrace their homegrown sound and begin rapping on beats infused with Unicorn151 and Ace Mula's signature Jersey club sound.

In 2020, PBS Soundfield visited Newark for a documentary to interview Uniiqu3, Unicorn151 aka Killa Kherk Cobain, DJ Fade, and DJ Tamiel for an in-depth segment detailing the newest evolutions of Jersey Club music and this new generation of Jersey Club Artists.

In 2021, Newark-based Jersey club rapper Bandmanrill released a reel via Instagram and TikTok where he joked about rapping drill lyrics over a Jersey club beat.  The skit went viral as fans took an immediate liking to Bandmanrill's drill-like flow, cadence, and lyrics over the Jersey Club beat. Bandmanrill went on to turn his skit into the full length single and video titled "HeartBroken" produced by Newark producer McVert.  This sparked a widespread social media debate on platforms like TikTok, Instagram, and Facebook as to what this new sound should be called or titled. Jersey Drill or Jersey Club Drill?

In 2021, Unicorn151 aka Killa Kherk Cobain, Bandmanrill, and Ace Mula released the first official Jersey Drill song and music video titled "Jack N Drill".  Together they solidified and jump-started the Jersey Drill movement by collaborating on the "Jack N Drill" single, which was followed by a drill-style music video signifying that this sound is officially the "Jersey Drill" sound. The title "Jack N Drill" is a triple-entendre play on words.  "Jackin" is street slang for stealing or robbing. Newark, New Jersey is historically notorious for "car jackin" so it can humorously be said that New Jersey is "jackin" or forcefully taking the drill sound from the UK and Brooklyn.  "Jackin" is also street slang in NYC for "claiming something with pride".  Many NYC drill artists tout that they are "jackin" a certain gang affiliation. Thus, "Jack N Drill" can also be interpreted that New Jersey is pridefully claiming the drill sound as their own sub-genre.  "Jack N Drill" also plays off of the story "Jack and Jill", which can be interpreted that New Jersey and Brooklyn Drill see themselves as partners overcoming the same obstacles and working towards the same goal.

In 2021 Ace Mula produced and released the first ever full length Jersey Drill EP titled "Jack N Drill" featuring artists Bandmanrill and Unicorn151 aka Killa Kherk Cobain.  Jersey Club producer DJ 809 also produced and released a full-length Jersey Club / Jersey Drill album featuring rappers MBM Franko and Unicorn aka Killa Kherk Cobain on the lead single titled "Jersey Drill".

While many in the Jersey Club music scene refer to and recognize this sound as Jersey Drill, there is a debate as to whether it should actually be recognized as "Jersey Club Drill" since there are many New Jersey rappers who utilize the drill rap cadence over Brooklyn Drill and UK Drill beats without any of the Jersey Club influence.

Popular New Jersey drill artists include Unicorn151 aka Killa Kherk Cobain, MBM Franko, Bandmanrill, Ib Mattic, Daidough, and Baby ATM.

Dance culture
Strong emphasis on dance accompaniment is a major element in Jersey club culture, as evidenced by performances at Jersey club-centric events, including Essex County's Highlights Festival held annually in the summer.

The 2016 Running Man Challenge, a viral meme in which participants filmed and shared short clips of themselves performing a dance resembling running to the 1996 song "My Boo," was based on well-known Jersey club moves. The original videos were posted on Vine by high school students in Newark-adjacent Hillside.

See also
Baltimore club
Deconstructed club
New Jersey sound

References

House music genres
Dance music genres
Music of New Jersey
Culture of Newark, New Jersey
Breakbeat genres